The Morice River is the outflow of Morice Lake south west of Houston, British Columbia, Canada.  Morice Lake and Morice River are named after Father Adrien-Gabriel Morice Geographic Name details  The Morice has many small creeks joining it along its length, but retains the clear glacial hue for its length.  The Morice river continues on to the town of Houston at which point the river is joined by a small tributary river called "The Little Bulkley" and the two rivers joined become the Bulkley River. They become the Bulkley, not the Morice despite the fact the Morice is larger. This was done by Poudrier, a government cartographer who, it is rumoured, never saw the region.

Status
The Morice River was listed as the 6th most endangered river in British Columbia due to the proposed Enbridge Northern Gateway Pipelines which would have carried diluted bitumen. The report was issued by the Outdoor Recreation Council of British Columbia.

The Northern Gateway Pipeline did not make substantial progress following approval with 209 conditions. Subsequently the approval was quashed by the courts. 

The Morice River is also crossed by the approved Coastal GasLink Pipeline which will carry natural gas. Some hereditary chiefs of the Wetʼsuwetʼen oppose the pipeline on the grounds that it will disrupt salmon populations and decrease water quality. The crossing of the Morice is planned to be accomplished by trenchless crossing, though crossing of tributaries are not using this method, leading to concern of increased turbidity. The First Nations name for the Morice river is Wedzin Kwa.

References

External links
Morice River Pictures

Regional District of Bulkley-Nechako
Rivers of British Columbia
Skeena Country